"Say Less" is a single by American electronic music producer Dillon Francis featuring American rapper G-Eazy. It was released on April 5, 2017

Composition
Website edm.com mentioned: "The song can heard G-Eazy’s vocals match up perfectly with the rhythms and vibe heard in the track."

Music video
The music video was released on July 13, 2017, directed by Mr. Whitmore. It was shot in Los Angeles, and starred Francis and G-Eazy. Just like the title of the song, recorded a euphoric and raucous night out. It also featured a special cameo by Australian actor Luke Hemsworth.

Charts

Weekly charts

Year-end charts

References

2017 singles
2017 songs
Dillon Francis songs
G-Eazy songs
Songs written by Dillon Francis